Rudolf Alfred Bosshardt (1 January 1897 – 6 November 1993) was a British Protestant Christian missionary in China. He served with the China Inland Mission (CIM). He was one of two Europeans who were compelled to accompany the soldiers of the Red Army on the Long March.

Life
Bosshardt was born of Swiss parents in Manchester, England, and was accepted for training by the China Inland Mission in 1920. Within two years he departed for China and was assigned to work in Guizhou Province. He was married to Rose Piaget (1894-1965) in Guiyang in June 1931. On 1 October 1934, exactly 12 years after he had left for China, while returning from a prayer conference with Rose and several other missionaries, they were captured by soldiers of the Red Army led by General Xiao Ke. Rose was later released, but he and a fellow CIM missionary, Arnolis Hayman, from New Zealand, were forced to join the Red Army on the weary trek, which later became known as the Long March. He trudged 2500 miles during the 18 months of captivity. He was released on Easter morning 1936, after 560 days of captivity. The book The Restraining Hand: Captivity for Christ in China, published in 1936, tells the story of this captivity. 

After being restored to health in Europe and doing many speaking engagements, he returned to China in 1940, until, like many foreign missionaries, he and Rose were expelled from China in 1951. They went on to work in Laos among the many Chinese who lived there. Following Rose's death in 1965, he returned and settled in Manchester in 1966, opening his house to Chinese students. There he continued a fruitful ministry to the Chinese and was a founder-member of the Manchester Chinese Christian Church, while remaining a faithful member of Union Hall Evangelical Church. The longest mile was his last, which he spent in a home for retired CIM missionaries in Pembury, Tunbridge Wells, Kent. He died at the age of 96 of bronchitis, in his room at Cornford House.

In 1973, Bosshardt published The Guiding Hand: Captivity and Answered Prayer in China, written with Gwen and Edward England. In 1989, the Chinese edition was published, with a foreword written by General Xiao Ke, where he stated that the book the most accurate account on the Long March written by foreigner.

Bibliography
 R. A. Bosshardt, The Restraining Hand: Captivity for Christ in China (1936)
 R. A. Boßhardt, Im Schatten des Allmächtigen. Erlebnisse des Missionars R. A. Boßhardt in der Gefangenschaft der Roten. Aus dem Englischen übersetzt von Dr. Ernst Witt. Bad Liebenzell: Buchhandlung der Liebenzeller Mission 1937 (156 S., einige Abb. auf Bildtafeln)
 R. A. Bosshardt, with Gwen and Edward England, The Guiding hand: Captivity and Answered Prayer in China (1973)
 Arnolis Hayman, A Foreign Missionary on the Long March: The Memoirs of Arnolis Hayman of the China Inland Mission (2010)
 Leslie T. Lyall, A Passion for the Impossible: The Continuing Story of the Mission Hudson Taylor Began (2d ed., 1976), chap. 3
 Harrison Salisbury, The Long March: The Untold Story (1985)
 Jean Watson, Bosshardt: A Biography (1995)
 The Guardian, November 8, 1993 (obit.)
 The Guardian, November 27, 2008.

Further reading
Historical Bibliography of the China Inland Mission

See also
List of CIM missionaries in China (up to 1953)

External links
Oral history by Rudolf Alfred Bosshardt. Imperial War Museums
BBC Radio 4 programme which discusses Bosshardt, and includes a short audio recording of him talking

English Protestant missionaries
Protestant missionaries in China
Protestant writers
1897 births
1993 deaths
British expatriates in China
British people of Swiss descent
Clergy from Manchester
Christianity in Guizhou